Prinsiri, also known as Prinsiri Public Company Limited, is one of the largest real estate developers in Thailand offering a full range of housing units.

History 
The Prinsiri Co. Ltd was founded in 2000. In 2004, it became a public limited company. As of the end of 2017, it had a registered capital of Thai baht(฿) 1,220.01 million, fully paid-up, and divided into Baht(฿) 1,220.01 million ordinary shares with a par value of Baht(฿) 1. The company primarily engages in real estate development of housing estates and residential condominiums. Prinsiri focuses on property development under the "Oxygen Community" concept. In 2017, it recorded Baht 3,014.41 million in real estate sales revenue.

Awards

See also 

 SET50 Index and SET100 Index
 Stock Exchange of Thailand

References

External links 

 Prinsiri corporate website

Thai brands
Real estate companies of Thailand
Companies established in 2000
Companies listed on the Stock Exchange of Thailand
Companies based in Bangkok
2000 establishments in Thailand